The Mysterious Little Bay or Lü-He Cliff is a bay in Dongju Island, Juguang Township, Lienchiang County, Taiwan.

History
The bay had been used by the local residents to hide from pirates.

Geology
The bay consists of many wave-cut gullies. It is also the gathering place for many birds.

See also
 List of tourist attractions in Taiwan

References

External link

Bays of Taiwan
Geography of Lienchiang County
Juguang Township
Tourist attractions in Lienchiang County